Jefferson Cardoso dos Santos (born February 15, 1986) is a Brazilian footballer who plays for Guarani in the Campeonato Brasileiro Série C.

References

1986 births
Living people
Brazilian footballers
Brazilian expatriate footballers
Austrian Football Bundesliga players
FC Red Bull Salzburg players
Guaratinguetá Futebol players
Brasiliense Futebol Clube players
Expatriate footballers in Austria
Association football defenders
People from São Vicente, São Paulo
Footballers from São Paulo (state)